The University of Western Australia Business School is a business school at the University of Western Australia (UWA). UWA first began teaching Economics in 1912, and the Business School is now home to over 4,929 students. The school has four disciplines: Accounting and Finance; Economics; Management and Organisations; and Marketing.

The School delivers undergraduate, postgraduate, and higher degrees by research and coursework programs and remains active in business research. The School is the only university in Western Australia to hold both the European Quality Improvement System (EQUIS) accreditation and Association to Advance Collegiate Schools of Business (AACSB) accreditation.

Profile 
The Business School's faculty comprises approximately 160 academic and professional staff, with 85 per cent of academics holding a PhD or equivalent degree.

There are over 5,700 students enrolled in the School; of these, 80 per cent are undergraduates, 18 per cent are completing a postgraduate degree by coursework, and 2 per cent are pursuing a higher degree by research.

A number of corporate companies provide research chairs and fellows, visiting professor programs, scholarships and prizes to the Business School.

The Business School's "Tomorrow Starts Here" fundraising campaign raised $25 million, and was named a state winner in the Fundraising Institute Australia's 2011 National Awards for Excellence in Fundraising raising.

Campus 
The Business School is situated on UWA's main Crawley campus in Perth, Western Australia. The UWA Business School was recently named one of the 50 most beautiful business school campuses in the world by MBA Programs.org.

Located next to the Matilda Bay Reserve on the Swan River and at the south end of the University campus, the $50 million Business School building was opened in May 2009. The building was designed by Woods Bagot.

Accreditations 
The Business School received accreditation from the European Quality Improvement System (EQUIS) in 2008 and Association to Advance Collegiate Schools of Business (AACSB) in 2011.

Courses 
Undergraduate

Majors in Accounting, Business Law, Economics, Finance, Human Resource Management, Management, Marketing, and Work and Employment Relations are taught predominantly through the Business School

Honours

Students who achieve a required standard can continue to focus on their chosen major while developing research skills through the Honours program, which consists of one more year of study.

Postgraduate

The School's postgraduate courses include the Master of Business Administration, Master of Commerce, and Master of Professional Accounting and specialised degrees in marketing, human resource management and employment relations, economics, business information management, and social impact.

MBA

Established in 1973, the UWA's MBA is the oldest in Western Australia. It has produced over 3,000 management graduates. According to the 2011 Good Universities Guide, the Business School's MBA program has a five-star rating for graduate salaries, getting a job, corporate links, and management faculty size, and in 2009 was ranked seventh in Australia in the Australian Financial Review BOSS MBA rankings.

Higher degrees by research

The Business School offers higher degrees by research, either through the master's degree by research programs or professional doctorate programs such as the Doctor of Business Administration (DBA) and Doctor of Philosophy (PhD). Research students work closely with a supervisor on a specific topic to produce a dissertation of significant academic originality. These programs are supposed to enhance research skills and to develop independent and critical thinking so students can contribute state-of-the-art knowledge through research in their chosen fields.

Business School Board 
The Business School Board is tasked with providing leadership to the School. It comprises the Dean, Deputy Dean, and six to ten persons actively engaged in industries, professions, community, or government activities relevant to the work of the Faculty. These members are appointed by the Vice-Chancellor on the recommendation of the Dean and the Chair. The Chair is elected annually by and from the external members of the Board and meetings are held at least twice a year.

Notable graduates 
Notable alumni of the UWA Business School include:
Mark Barnaba, co-founder, Azure Capital, Chair of Macquarie Group Western Australia, Western Power and Edge Employment Solutions, Non-Executive Director, Fortescue Metals Group Ltd
 Colin Barnett, Premier of Western Australia
Boediono, Vice-President, Indonesia
 Michael Chaney AO, UWA Chancellor, Chairman of National Australia Bank, Woodside Petroleum and Gresham Partners
Richard Court AC, former Premier, Western Australia
Andrew Forrest, Billionaire founder of West Australian iron ore miner Fortescue Metals Group.
Darren Glass, MBA class of 2015 and former captain of the West Coast Eagles
Richard Goyder, Managing Director and CEO, Wesfarmers
John Willinge, CEO Alverstoke Group LLC

The Graduate Management Association (GMA) 
Past Presidents of the GMA include:

 Paul McCann AM, operations management consultant
 Thomas Murrell, Managing Director of 8M Media and Communications

See also 
University of Western Australia
List of University of Western Australia people
Official Openings by the Monarch in Australia

References

Notes 

 http://www.efmd.org/index.php?option=com_content&view=article&id=1&Itemid=182
 http://www.tisc.edu.au/
 https://web.archive.org/web/20110407231628/http://www.secretariat.uwa.edu.au/home/rhodes?f=192731
 http://www.go8.edu.au/students
 http://www.go8.edu.au/government-a-business/benchmarking-a-stats
 http://www.topuniversities.com/university/678/university-of-western-australia

External links 
 The University of Western Australia

University of Western Australia Business School
Business School
University of Western Australia Business School
Economy of Western Australia
1911 establishments in Australia